Rafał Szombierski (born 12 March 1982 in Pyskowice, Poland) is a Polish motorcycle speedway rider.

Speedway Grand Prix results

Career

World Under-21 Championship
2000 - 12th place in Semi-Final
2003 - 3rd place (11 points +3)

Individual European Championship
2002 - 3rd place (11 points +3)
2003 - 6th place (9 points)

Individual U-19 European Championship
2001 - 7th place in Semi-Final

European Pairs Championship
2004 - 3rd place (9 points +2)

Polish Under-21 Championship
2002 - 6th place
2003 - 7th place

Polish Under-21 Pairs Championship
2002 - 2nd place
2003 - Polish Champion

Polish Under-21 Team Championship
2000 - 2nd place with Rybnik
2001 - 3rd place with Rybnik
2002 - Polish Champion with Rybnik

Golden Helmet
2005 - 4th place

Silver Helmet (U-21)
2000 - injury

Bronze Helmet (U-19)
1999 - 11th place
2001 - Winner

See also
List of Speedway Grand Prix riders
Poland national speedway team

External links
 RKM Rybnik website 

1982 births
Living people
Polish speedway riders
People from Pyskowice
Sportspeople from Silesian Voivodeship